Tricholoma atrodiscum is a mushroom of the agaric genus Tricholoma. It was described as new to science in 1989.

See also
List of North American Tricholoma

References

External links
 

Fungi described in 1989
Fungi of North America
atrodiscum